Te Pihopatanga o Te Tairāwhiti (the bishopric of the east coast; aka Te Hui Amorangi..., lit. the synod...) is an Episcopal polity (or Diocese) of Anglican Church in Aotearoa, New Zealand and Polynesia in Tairāwhiti.

The Pīhopatanga serves communities on the East Coast of New Zealand's North Island – from Potaka in the North, to Woodville in the South. In general this covers the Ngāti Porou, Ngāti Kahungunu and the Turanga-nui-a-kiwa iwi. , there are approximately 17,000 Māori Anglicans within this area.

The current Pīhopa o (Bishop of) Te Tairāwhiti is Donald Tamihere.

Ministry
Te Tairāwhiti is one of five Episcopal Units that comprise Te Pīhopatanga o Aotearoa.

There are five rohe (ministry units) within Te Tairāwhiti:

Parishes
Te Tairāwhiti has around 30 parishes (pariha) spread across four rohe.

The Pīhopatanga is also home to two Māori Anglican boarding schools, Te Aute College and Hukarere Girls' College.

Leadership

Archbishop Brown Turei was elected as the first Pīhopa o Te Tairāwhiti (Bishop of Te Tairāwhiti) in 1992. Turei was also Te Pīhopa o Aotearoa (Head of the Māori Anglican Church) and Archbishop of the Anglican Church in Aotearoa-New Zealand and Polynesia. Turei had planned to retire as bishop in March 2017 but he died on January 9, 2017. At 92, Brown was the oldest Primate in the Anglican Communion.

In March 2016 Donald Tamihere was elected to succeed Turei at an electoral synod held at the Toko Toru Tapu Church, Manutuke, following the announcement of Turei's retirement earlier in the year. Tamihere was ordained and installed as the second bishop of (Pīhopa o) Te Tairāwhiti at a service held at Waiomatatini Marae, Ruatoria on March 11, 2017. Tamihere also became Te Pīhopa o Aotearoa on 7 March 2018, following his nomination at Te Runanganui, September 2017 and the consent of Te Hīnota Whānui / General Synod; and automatically Pīhopa Matāmua / Primate and Archbishop.

Maui Tangohau serves as Vicar General of Tairāwhiti.

Canon Emeritus

The Reverend Canon Huatahi Niania
The Reverend Canon Keeni Priestley
The Reverend Canon Brent Swann
The Reverend Canon Tiopira Tuhiwai
The Reverend Canon Jacqueline Moana Te Amo
The Reverend Canon Morehu Te Maro

References

Tairāwhiti, Te Pīhopatanga o Te
Gisborne District